Aleksandr Ionovich Boyarsky (born September 28, 1957) is the CEO of the Melnitsa Animation Studio, producer, screenwriter, voice actor, and composer.

Biography 
Aleksandr Boyarsky was born on September 28, 1957, in Šiauliai.

He graduated from the Leningrad Institute of Film Engineers in 1987.

In 1992, he founded a small recording studio "Midi-Cinema" together with composer Valentin Vasenkov.

Since 1999, he is the chief executive officer of the Melnitsa Animation Studio.

He is the author of the idea for the animated series "Luntik."

On February 28, 2015, he was presented to the Government awards in the field of culture for 2014. He was awarded the prize together with the directors Darina Schmidt and Elena Galdobina, and screenwriter Anna Sarantseva for he creation of an animated series for children "Luntik."

On April 8, 2016, he participated in the second ceremony of the Ikar National Animation Award that took place at the ZIL Cultural Center. The prize in the nomination "Film in cinematography" was awarded to the film Ivan Tsarevich and the Gray Wolf 3 (director Darina Schmidt, producers Aleksandr Boyarsky, Sergey Selyanov).

Awards 

 The main prize of the Annecy International Animation Film Festival (France, 1998).
 2015 – Prize of the President of the Russian Federation in the field of literature and art for works for children and youth of 2015 – for contributing to the development of Russian animation cinema.
 2017 – Ikar National Animation Award in the nominations "Producer" and "For stable success in the Russian film distribution".

Filmography

Producer 

 Die Hard (1996)
 Little Longnose (2003)
 Deity (2003)
 Alyosha Popovich and Tugarin Zmey (2004)
 Dobrinya and the Dragon (2005)
 Luntik (2006–present)
 Lavatory – Lovestory (2006)
 Ilya Muromets and Nightingale the Robber (2007)
 The Tale of Soldier Fedot, The Daring Fellow (2008)
 How Not to Rescue a Princess (2010)
 Ivan Tsarevich and the Gray Wolf (2011)
 The Barkers (2011–present)
 Three Heroes on the Distant Shores (2012)
 Ivan Tsarevich and the Gray Wolf 2 (2013)
 We Can't Live Without Cosmos (2014)
 Three Heroes. Horse Course (2014)
 The Fortress. With Shield and Sword (2015)
 Ivan Tsarevich and the Gray Wolf 3 (2015)
 Three Heroes and the Sea King (2016)
 Fantastic Journey to Oz (2017)
 Three Heroes and the Princess of Egypt (2017)
 Little Tiaras (2018–present)
 Three Heroes. The Heiress to the Throne (2018)
 He Can't Live Without Cosmos (2019)
 Fantastic Return to Oz (2019)
 Ivan Tsarevich and the Gray Wolf 4 (2019)
 The Barkers: Mind the Cats! (2020)
 Horse Julius and Big Horse Racing (2020)
 Three Heroes and a Horse on the Throne (2021)
 The Barkers Team (2022)
 Ivan Tsarevich and the Gray Wolf 5 (2022)

Executive producer 

 Adventures in the Emerald City (1999–2000)
 The Cat and the Fox (2004)

Screenwriter 

 Little Longnose (2003)
 Alyosha Popovich and Tugarin Zmey (2004)
 Dobrinya and the Dragon (2005)
 Ilya Muromets and Nightingale the Robber (2007)
 How Not to Rescue a Princess (2010)
 Baikino Village (2010)
 Sym-Bionic Titan (2010)
 Ivan Tsarevich and the Gray Wolf (2011)
 Three Heroes on the Distant Shores (2012)
 Ivan Tsarevich and the Gray Wolf 2 (2013)
 Three Heroes. Horse Course (2014)
 The Fortress. With Shield and Sword (2015)
 Three Heroes and the Sea King (2016)
 Fantastic Journey to Oz (2017)
 Three Heroes and the Princess of Egypt (2017)
 Little Tiaras (2018–present)
 Fantastic Return to Oz (2019)
 The Barkers: Mind the Cats! (2020)
 Horse Julius and Big Horse Racing (2020)
 Three Heroes and a Horse on the Throne (2021)
 Ivan Tsarevich and the Gray Wolf 5 (2022)

Composer 

 Midnight Games (1991)
 Three Heroes and the Princess of Egypt (2017)
 Fantastic Return to Oz (2019)
 Ivan Tsarevich and the Gray Wolf 4 (2019)
 The Barkers: Mind the Cats! (2020)
 Horse Julius and Big Horse Racing (2020)
 Three Heroes and a Horse on the Throne (2021)
 Ivan Tsarevich and the Gray Wolf 5 (2022)

Sound Director 

 Switchcraft (1994)
 Die Hard (1996)
 Adventures in the Emerald City (1999–2000)
 The Cat and the Fox (2004)

Director 

 Baikino Village (2010)

Voice acting 

 Luntik (2006–present)
 Ilya Muromets and Nightingale the Robber (2007) — one-eyed robber (voice)
 Ivan Tsarevich and the Gray Wolf (2011) — The Spirit (Shadow) (voice)
 Three Heroes on the Distant Shores (2012) — princely clerk (voice)
 Ivan Tsarevich and the Gray Wolf 2 (2013) — Grey Wolf (voice)
 How to Catch a Firebird Feather (2013) — episodes (voice)
 Three Heroes. Horse Course (2014) — boyar Antip (voice)
 The Fortress. With Shield and Sword (2015) — baker Philemon (voice)
 Ivan Tsarevich and the Gray Wolf 3 (2015) — Grey Wolf (voice)
 Three Heroes and the Sea King (2016) — Kikimora (voice)
 Fantastic Journey to Oz (2017) — Ogre (voice)
 Three Heroes and the Princess of Egypt (2017) — Nefertiti's Father, episodes (voice)
 Little Tiaras (2018–present) — Guardian oak (voice)
 Three Heroes. The Heiress to the Throne (2018) — Emperor Basileus (voice)
 Fantastic Return to Oz (2019) — Ogre, Sabretooth Tigers, chief of the Karachi tribe (voice)
 Ivan Tsarevich and the Gray Wolf 4 (2019) — Grey Wolf, episodes (voice)
 Three Heroes and a Horse on the Throne (2021) — The Thin (voice)

References

External Links 
 Aleksandr Boyarsky at the Animator.ru
 
 Interview with Aleksandr Boyarsky on the Three Heroes franchise (in Russian)
 Aleksandr Boyarsky on Russian computer technologies for animation (in Russian)
 Aleksandr Boyarsky — "We Do Not Have Good Screenwriters"(in Russian)
 Aleksandr Boyarsky, head of the Melnitsa Animation Studio — Bogatyr Cash Desk

1957 births
Living people
Russian producers
Russian screenwriters
Russian voice actors
Russian directors
Russian animated film producers
Russian male voice actors
Russian animators
Soviet composers
Russian composers
Russian audio engineers